Ivan Guteša (born 4 April 2002) is a Serbian footballer who currently plays as a goalkeeper for Grafičar Beograd.

Career statistics

Club

Notes

References

2002 births
Living people
Serbian footballers
Association football goalkeepers
Serbian First League players
RFK Grafičar Beograd players
People from Vršac